Matías Osadczuk (born 22 April 1997) is an Argentine rugby union player.

He tore a knee ligament against Australia at the 2017 Hong Kong Sevens tournament and required surgery before he returned to competitive action at the 2018 Sydney Sevens tournament. He won gold at the 2019 Pan American Games in Lima, Peru. He was named in the Argentina squad for the 2020 Summer Olympics.
Osadczuk competed for Argentina at the 2022 Rugby World Cup Sevens in Cape Town.

References 

1997 births
Living people
Argentine rugby union players
Argentine rugby sevens players
Olympic rugby sevens players of Argentina
Rugby sevens players at the 2020 Summer Olympics
Pan American Games gold medalists for Argentina
Pan American Games medalists in rugby sevens
Rugby sevens players at the 2019 Pan American Games
Medalists at the 2019 Pan American Games
Olympic medalists in rugby sevens
Medalists at the 2020 Summer Olympics
Olympic bronze medalists for Argentina